Bidens mannii is a species of flowering plant in the family Asteraceae. It is endemic to Cameroon. Its natural habitat is subtropical or tropical high-altitude grassland. It is threatened by habitat loss.

References

mannii
Endemic flora of Cameroon
Vulnerable plants
Plants described in 1845
Taxonomy articles created by Polbot